The 2001 Gran Turismo 3 Grand Prix of Mosport was an American Le Mans Series professional sports car race held at Mosport International Raceway near Bowmanville, Ontario, Canada from August 17 to the 19, 2001. It is named after Gran Turismo 3: A-Spec, a racing game released on July 10th, 2001, a month prior to this event. It was the seventh round of the 2001 American Le Mans Series season and the 16th IMSA / Professional SportsCar Racing sanctioned sports car race held at the facility.

Race

The overall race victory went to Audi Sport North America drivers Frank Biela and Emanuele Pirro marking the Audi R8's second consecutive win at Mosport.  Second place went to Jan Magnussen and David Brabham in the Panoz LMP-1 Roadster-S, with Team Cadillac drivers Emmanuel Collard and Christophe Tinseau picking up the first American Le Mans Series podium for the Cadillac Northstar LMP01.

Dick Barbour Racing took the LMP675 victory with drivers Bruno Lambert and Didier de Radigues in the Reynard 01Q.

Corvette Racing drivers Ron Fellows and Johnny O'Connell drove the Chevrolet Corvette C5-R to the GTS class victory with BMW Schnitzer Motorsport drivers Jörg Müller and JJ Lehto taking the GT win in the BMW M3 GTR.

The race was held under cool and rainy conditions and was broadcast across North America on NBC Sports with Rick Benjamin and Bill Adam calling the race.

Official results
Class winners in bold.

Statistics
 Pole Position - #1 Audi Sport North America - 1:08.222
 Fastest Lap - #2 Audi Sport North America - 1:10.002
 Time of race - 2:46:03.805
 Distance - 455.098 km
 Average Speed - 164.430 km/h

References

External links
 2001 Grand Prix of Mosport Race Broadcast (American Le Mans Series YouTube Channel)
 Official Results
 World Sports Racing Prototypes - Race Results

Mosport
Grand Prix of Mosport
Grand Prix of Mosport
 Grand Prix of Mosport